Gavlimak (also Romanized as Gāvlīmāk) is a village in Chehel Shahid Rural District, in the Central District of Ramsar County, Mazandaran Province, Iran. At the 2006 census, its population was 184, in 54 families.

References 

Populated places in Ramsar County